Bryce Hospital opened in 1861 in Tuscaloosa, Alabama, United States. It is Alabama's oldest and largest inpatient psychiatric facility. First known as the Alabama State Hospital for the Insane and later as the Alabama Insane Hospital, the building is considered an architectural model. The hospital currently houses 268 beds for acute care, treatment and rehabilitation of full-time (committed) patients. The Mary Starke Harper Geriatric Psychiatry Hospital, a separate facility on the same campus, provides an additional 100 beds for inpatient geriatric care.  The main facility was added to the National Register of Historic Places in 1977.

History
The plans for a state hospital for the mentally ill in Alabama began in 1852. The new facility was planned from the start to utilize the "moral architecture" concepts of 1830s activists Thomas Story Kirkbride and Dorothea Dix. Dix's reformist ideas, in particular, are credited as the driving force behind the construction of the hospital. Architect Samuel Sloan designed the Italianate building using the Kirkbride Plan. Construction of the building began in 1853 but was not completed until 1859. The hospital was the first building in Tuscaloosa with gas lighting and central heat, "all clad in a fashionable Italianate exterior."

The Alabama Insane Hospital opened in 1861.  It was later renamed for its first superintendent, Peter Bryce, who had first begun as a 27-year-old psychiatric pioneer from South Carolina. Bryce had been brought to the attention of the hospital trustees by Dix. He had studied mental-health care in Europe and worked in psychiatric hospitals in New Jersey, as well as his native state of South Carolina.  His tenure was marked by absolute discipline among the staff of the hospital. He demanded that patients be given courtesy, kindness and respect at all times. The use of shackles, straitjackets and other restraints was discouraged, and finally abandoned altogether in 1882. Various work programs and other activities were encouraged, including farming, sewing, maintenance and crafts. Between 1872 and the early 1880s, some of the patients wrote and edited their own newspaper, called The Meteor. These writings provide a rare inside look at life in a progressive mental institution in the late 19th century. At that time, Bryce's management and commitment to "scientific treatments" was recognized around the country as being in a class of its own.

Decline
During the 20th century, the patient population expanded while standards of care fell to abysmal levels. Alabama Governor Lurleen Wallace viewed the facility in February 1967, and was moved to tears after an overweight, mentally challenged nine-year-old attempted to hug her, crying, "Mama! Mama!" She lobbied her husband, George Wallace (who held the actual power of her governorship) for more funds for the institution.

In 1970, Alabama ranked last among U.S. states in funding for mental health. Bryce Hospital at that time had 5,200 patients living in conditions that a Montgomery Advertiser editor likened to a concentration camp. That same year, a cigarette tax earmarked for mental-health treatment was cut. One hundred Bryce employees were laid off, including twenty professional staff. Members of the Department of Psychology at the University of Alabama attempted to file suit on behalf of the laid-off workers, but Federal Judge Frank M. Johnson ruled that the courts had no standing to intervene on behalf of fired employees. He left open, however, the possibility of a suit filed on behalf of patients, whose quality of care was affected.

Wyatt v. Stickney

In October 1970, Ricky Wyatt, a fifteen-year-old who had always been labeled a "juvenile delinquent" and housed at Bryce despite not being diagnosed with a mental illness, became the named plaintiff in a class-action lawsuit. His aunt, W. C. Rawlins, was one of the employees who had been laid off. Together they testified about intolerable conditions and improper treatments designed only to make the patients more manageable. In 1971 the plaintiff class was expanded to include patients at Alabama's two other inpatient mental health facilities, Searcy Hospital (Mt. Vernon) and Partlow State School(Coker). The resulting court-ordered agreements formed the basis for federal minimum standards for the care of people with mental illness or developmental disabilities who reside in institutional settings. In 1999 a new settlement agreement was made, recognizing a great deal of progress. The case was finally dismissed on December 5, 2003, with the finding by Judge Myron H. Thompson that Alabama was in compliance with the agreement.

The standards elaborated in that agreement have served as a model nationwide.  Known as the "Wyatt Standards," they are founded on four criteria for evaluation of care:
 Humane psychological and physical environment
 Qualified and sufficient staff for administration of treatment
 Individualized treatment plans
 Minimum restriction of patient freedom.

The case of Wyatt v. Stickney came to a conclusion after 33 years, through the tenure of nine Alabama governors and fourteen state mental health commissioners, the longest mental health case in national history. The State of Alabama estimates its litigation expenses at over $15 million.

Future of Bryce Hospital

Gov. Bob Riley announced on December 30, 2009 that Bryce Hospital was to relocate into a newly constructed facility across McFarland Boulevard in Tuscaloosa, and the University of Alabama (UA) would take over the current Bryce campus.  For several years the university had sought the  parcel of land, which is adjacent to its landlocked campus.

Riley said that a hospital for about 268 patients had been envisioned but the final size was yet to be determined. The deal, approved by Gov. Bob Riley and the Alabama Department of Mental Health on December 30, 2009 was worth $72 million in cash for Mental Health to build a replacement hospital. The university will pay $50 million in cash and Mental Health will get another $22 million in state bond money. The university pledged another $10 million to clean up environmental problems on the Bryce grounds and restore the main hospital building, construction of which started in 1853.

The sale of Bryce Hospital and Harper Center to UA was finalized on May 27, 2010 at a price of $87.75 million. $77 million would go to installments plus the aforementioned $10 million for ground improvements. 
In 2014, the remaining patients were moved to a new facility, on the former Partlow Center area, and UA began a restoration project estimated at $40 million. Dan Wolfe, University of Alabama planner, revealed the two buildings will house a welcome center, 
two museums focusing on mental health and the history of the university, event space and classrooms for performing arts students. The project is expected to be complete by 2020.

Gallery

See also
 Alabama Department of Mental Health
 Bazelon Center for Mental Health Law
 The Meteor, an internal paper published by the residents of Bryce Hospital between 1872 and 1881.

References

Further reading
Robert O. Mellown. (Spring 1994). "Mental Health and Moral Architecture." Alabama Heritage. Issue #32.
Rev. Joseph Camp. (1882) An Insight into an Insane Asylum., self-published "exposé" of conditions at Bryce.
John S. Hughes, editor (1993). The Letters of a Victorian Madwoman. Columbia, SC: University of South Carolina Press. , the letters of Andrew Sheffield giving details of a woman's life at Bryce at the end of the 19th century.
Bill L. Weaver (January 1996) "Survival at the Alabama Insane Hospital, 1861-1892," Journal of the History of Medicine and Allied Sciences. 51, pages 5–28.

External links
 
 Burt Rieff. (April 1999) "Meteor: The "remarkable enterprise" at the Alabama Insane Hospital, 1872-1881", The Alabama Review,   - accessed August 23, 2005.
 Clarence J. Sundram. (2003) "Wyatt v. Stickney - A Long Odyssey Reaches an End." American Association on Mental Retardation.  - accessed August 23, 2005.
 History of Mental Health in Alabama on the ADMH Web site - accessed January 4, 2011.
 Photos of the abandoned Kirkbride and treatment buildings
 

1861 establishments in Alabama
Psychiatric hospitals in Alabama
National Register of Historic Places in Tuscaloosa County, Alabama
Italianate architecture in Alabama
Kirkbride Plan hospitals
Buildings and structures in Tuscaloosa, Alabama
Historic American Buildings Survey in Alabama
Hospital buildings on the National Register of Historic Places in Alabama